Dezső Bordán (born 26 June 1943) is a Hungarian gymnast. He competed in eight events at the 1968 Summer Olympics.

References

1943 births
Living people
Hungarian male artistic gymnasts
Olympic gymnasts of Hungary
Gymnasts at the 1968 Summer Olympics
Sportspeople from Eger